Europa 7 HD is an Italian group of channels aired since 11 October 2010. It's one of the first broadcasters in the world to use the DVB-T2 technology, after United Kingdom's channels BBC HD, ITV HD and Channel 4 HD.

Legal battle

In Spring 2010, after a ten years long legal battle, Europa 7 finally got assigned a national terrestrial TV frequency (that is, a multiplex), able to cover 95% of Italy's population and 80% of the territory.

Start of broadcasts, coverage and technology
Europa 7 HD began testing broadcasts in July 2010 and aired its regular broadcasting debut on 11 October 2010, with the purpose of covering 80% of the population by the end of 2010. While BBC, ITV and Channel 4 only have one or two of their channels in DVB-T2, Europa 7 HD transmits all of its eleven channels with this technology; it has been announced as "the first broadcaster in the world to broadcast with this new technology."

The DVB-T2 technology is comparable to the one used by the UK service company Freeview HD, which also has only one multiplex. Freeview HD hosts five fixed HD channels, while E7HD has twelve channels with alternating schedules, of which eight HD and four SD. As for Freeview HD, bandwidth is dynamically allocated between channels, depending on the complexity of the images – with the aim of maintaining a consistent quality, rather than a specific bit rate; video for each channel can range between 3 Mb/s and 17 Mbit/s.

Like for United Kingdom's channels BBC HD, BBC One HD, ITV HD and Channel 4 HD, a tuner box compatible with the DVB-T2 standard is necessary. The first box was on sale in the UK in February 2010 for £130, and in Italy in August 2010 for €150.

Editorial line
Francesco Di Stefano, the owner of Europa 7, said that the project aims to make of Fly channel a politically independent channel based on freedom of information, hosting the journalists and comedians controversially censored by the other broadcasters.

Channels
For strategic reasons, it changed its original 1998 plan of using its multiplex to broadcast a single analogic channel, into broadcasting twelve digital channels. Of these twelve, one called Fly channel pursues the original project of a free aired channel; the other for-pay eleven channels serve the purpose of assuring proper funding for the Fly channel.

Having a full multiplex for itself, Europa 7 HD hosts twelve alternating channels, all of them broadcast in DVB-T2. They are:
Fly channel, a free of charge generalist Standard Definition channel, with news, satire and culture
Five HD thematic channels based on paid subscription: Sentimental, Horror, Classic, Action and Family. These will offer movies, documentaries, concerts and international events
Three pay-per-view HD channels offering movies most recently released on theatres.
Three adult content channels, based on paid subscription and in Standard Definition. They air with Parental control and from 23:30 till 6:00 in the morning.

References

Television channels in Italy